Arifiye is a district center of  Sakarya Province, Turkey. It is also included in Greater Sakarya Proper.

Geography 
Arifiye is situated at  just at the east of Lake Sapanca. It is  almost merged to Adapazarı the center of the province and it is a part of Greater Sakarya. (see Metropolitan centers in Turkey). Arifiye is on Turkish Motorway O-4 and state highway  both of which connect İstanbul to Ankara. It is also an important railway junction. The population of Arifiye was 32550  as of 2010.

History 
Arifiye is a part of ancient region of Bithynia. It later on fell to Roman Empire and Byzantine Empire. Several times it was plundered by the Sassanid Persians, Umayyad Arabs and Russians in the Middle Ages. After a brief occupation by the Seljuk Turks it was returned to Byzantines during the First Crusade. In 1326 Ottoman Turks annexed Arifiye. Although an important stop on Silk road in the Middle Ages because of frequent floods of the nearby Lake Sapanca it was not a populous settlement. During Turkish Republic  its population increased and by 1956 it was declared a seat of township. In 2008 it was declared a center of district within Greater Sakarya.

Economy 
Formerly the major economic sector in Arifiye was agriculture. But after the 1970s Arifiye became an important center of Automotive sub industry. Toyota is making the new C-HR here. The bus terminal of Greater Sakarya is also in Arifiye.  A train station is also in Arifiye, which will be the westernmost terminal of the Adana-Istanbul railway from February 2012 to 2015, while construction takes place in Istanbul's Haydarpaşa train station.

Rural Area 
There are five villages in the rural area of the district . The total population of the district (urban+rural) is 37864

References

 
Populated places in Sakarya Province